A United Nations Resident Coordinator is the highest United Nations official and the chief of UN diplomatic mission in a country (except when there is a mission of the Department of Peacekeeping Operations or similar, in which case the Special Representative of the Secretary-General is the highest official). 

The Resident Coordinator (RC) system encompasses all organizations of the United Nations system dealing with operational activities for development, regardless of their formal presence in the country. The RC system aims to bring together the different UN agencies to improve the efficiency and effectiveness of operational activities at the country level. Resident Coordinators lead UN country teams in more than 130 countries. Working closely with national governments, Resident Coordinators and country teams advocate the interests and mandates of the UN system while drawing on the support and guidance of the entire UN family.

Further details 
The RC's role in the country is multifaceted, and his or her responsibilities include: All representatives of UNS organisations at the country level report to the RC on matters related to the working of the UNCT and implementation of the jointly agreed UNCT work programme derived from the UNDAF and/or the equivalent post-crisis development plan. The RC is accountable to the UNS at the global level, with inputs from the regional directors teams and designated managers from headquarters – including to the RC’s performance appraisal – through the UNDG Chair, to the CEB. The RC is also accountable for ensuring that the UNCT are kept fully informed on interactions s/he has on behalf of the UNS with the Government, donor community and other development partners.

While the primary responsibility for coordinating humanitarian assistance rests with national authorities, the RCS is responsible for supporting national efforts. If international humanitarian assistance is required and a separate Humanitarian Coordinator (HC) position is not established, the RC is accountable to the UN Emergency Relief Coordinator (ERC) for the strategic and operational coordination of the response efforts of UNCT member agencies and relevant humanitarian actors (national and international humanitarian organisations, bilateral actors), in support of national efforts. The UN ERC may choose to designate the RC as HC, in consultation with the Inter-Agency Standing Committee, if the situation so requires.

If a Special Representative of the Secretary-General is appointed, the RC/HC will normally function as Deputy Special Representative of the Secretary-General under his/her overall authority, with responsibility for the coordination of development and humanitarian assistance, including early and longer-term recovery, in the context of RC/UNCT consultative arrangements (as per the SG Guidance Note on Integration). In locations where there is no resident SRSG or Special Envoy, and in the event of a significant deterioration or evolution of the political situation in the country, the RC liaises with the Department of Political Affairs for support.

References

United Nations posts